Martin Stevens is a British sensory and evolutionary ecologist, known for his work on animal camouflage, especially disruptive coloration.

Career

Stevens took his Ph.D. at the University of Bristol in 2006. He then worked as a research fellow at the University of Cambridge, before moving to the University of Exeter where his is a full professor in its Centre for Ecology and Conservation.

Works

Stevens has published over 100 journal papers, including "Animal camouflage: current issues and new perspectives", cited over 350 times, "Using digital photography to study animal coloration", cited over 345 times, and "Disruptive coloration and background pattern matching", cited at least 340 times. He has written or edited textbooks including Cheats and Deceits: How Animals and Plants Exploit and Mislead (2011), which discusses how animals and plants use mimicry, deception, and trickery for protection, reproduction and survival, Sensory Ecology, Behaviour, and Evolution (2013) and Animal Camouflage: From Mechanisms to Function (2011).

References

Animal cognition writers
British ecologists
Camouflage researchers
Evolutionary ecologists